Duttal is a village in Punjab of northern India, located at the edge of Patiala district.

Geography

The area is suitable for farming as is the case in all of Punjab and has an average elevation of 250 meters (820 feet).

References

 https://soki.in/duttal-patran-patiala

Villages in Patiala district